Jampack was a demo series from Sony under its PlayStation Underground brand. It was used to advertise and preview upcoming and released PlayStation and PlayStation 2 games through demos and featurettes. It often included imported game demos, behind-the-scenes videos on developers and games, as well as cheat codes and saved games. Jampack often served as a preview for the PlayStation Underground online magazine.

The series previewed many popular games from the PS2's lifespan, ranging from SSX Tricky and Final Fantasy X to Need for Speed Underground and Tony Hawk's Pro Skater 3.

Many of the later PS2 Jampack volumes were issued with the option of a counterpart that removed or replaced any demos for mature-rated and some teen-rated games, essentially serving as a clean version of the compilations.

Volumes

Notes

References

PlayStation (console) games
PlayStation 2 games